= Mohamed Ismail Gafoor =

Singaporean Indian business executive (born 1963)

- Born: 1963 (age 62–63); Singapore
- Occupation: CEO of PropNex

Mohamed Ismail Gafoor (born 1963) is a Singaporean Indian business executive who was the CEO of the real estate company PropNex.
